Kuhan or Kowhan in Iran may refer to:
 Kuhan, Isfahan
 Kowhan, Tiran and Karvan, Isfahan Province
 Shahrak-e Kowhan, Isfahan Province
 Kuhan, Kerman
 Kowhan, Semnan